This is a list of destinations served by Egyptair as of March 2022. The list includes terminated destinations some of which were operated as Misr Airwork, Misr Airlines, Misr Air and United Arab Airlines (UAA). For freighter destinations see Egyptair Cargo.

List

See also
Air Sinai
Egyptair Cargo

References

EgyptAir
Lists of airline destinations
Star Alliance destinations